On March 20, 1976, an exceptionally violent tornado struck the Metro Detroit suburbs of Farmington Hills and West Bloomfield Township, Michigan. Rated as an F4 on the Fujita Scale, the tornado touched down in Farmington Hills at 7:15 p.m. near Halsted Road between 13 and 14 Mile Roads, along a sharp cold front crossing Michigan. The tornado cut a path four miles long and 350 yards wide across Oakland County before dissipating near Maple Road between Middlebelt and Inkster Roads. The tornado killed one, injured 55 and produced $50 million in damage. As of 2022, this is the last tornado stronger than an F3/EF3 to strike the Metro Detroit area.

Event
The tornado developed ahead of a powerful cold front that swept across Michigan during the day and evening. Ahead of the cold front temperatures rose to 67 and 71 in Flint and Detroit respectively on March 20. Behind the front, temperatures plunged into the low 20s by the evening of the 21st. South-Southwest winds to 60 mph just 5000 feet above the ground pumped warm, moist air into Michigan providing the fuel for the tornado. The tornado touched down at 7:15 pm, March 20, 1976 near Halsted Road between 13 and 14 Mile Roads in Farmington Hills, along a sharp cold front crossing the Metro Detroit area. The tornado then crossed into West Bloomfield, cutting a path four miles long and 350 yards wide across the Detroit suburb before dissipating near Maple Road (15 Mile Road) between Middlebelt and Inkster Roads. The tornado killed one, injured 55 and produced $50 million in damage, the costliest tornado in Oakland County history. The only casualty of the tornado was a fifteen year-old girl riding in a car with three other passengers. The tornado picked the teens' car up near the corner of Maple and Orchard Lake roads, and hurled it to the north side of Maple, crushing the roof and smashing the windows. The girl died, however the other three passengers survived.

Aftermath
After the tornado, Oakland County took immediate steps to develop and implement a county-wide tornado siren system. As of 2022, this was the last time the Metro Detroit area was hit by a tornado stronger than an F3/EF3.

See also
Tornadoes of 1976
List of North American tornadoes and tornado outbreaks

References

External links

F4 tornadoes
Tornadoes of 1976
Tornadoes in Michigan
1976 natural disasters in the United States
Metro Detroit
1976 in Michigan
March 1976 events in the United States